Malaysia–Namibia relations refers to bilateral foreign relations between Malaysia and Namibia. Malaysia has a high commission in Windhoek, and Namibia has a high commission in Kuala Lumpur. Both countries are members of Commonwealth of Nations and the Group of 77.

History 

Both countries were once part of the British Empire and before Namibia achieved its independence, Malaysia has contributed to some operations in Namibia by sending a group of soldiers to help monitor the Namibia elections and peace process. Today, the relations are much more focused in economic co-operation.

Economic relations 
During the Mahathir era, several agreements have been signed by both countries such as the agreement on economic, science and technical co-operation. In 2006, the total trade between Malaysia and Namibia worth around U$29 million, with exports valued at U$6.7 million and imports at U$22.3 million. Malaysia also stand as one of the major export partner for Namibia. There are also opportunities for Namibian students to study in Malaysia, and Namibia is keen to learn Malaysian education system.

References 

 
Namibia
Bilateral relations of Namibia
Namibia
Malaysia